Cima di Cece (2,754 m) is a peak in the Fiemme Mountains  in Trentino, Italy. It is the highest peak of the Lagorai range, and lies south of the village of Predazzo. It is usually climbed from its northern side, from the Malga Di Valmaggiore  mountain barn at 1,620 m, where a simple hike is required to reach the summit.

References

Mountains of the Alps
Mountains of Trentino
Fiemme Mountains